Uruguaysuchidae is a family of notosuchian crocodyliforms that lived in South America and Africa during the Cretaceous period. It includes the genera Araripesuchus and Uruguaysuchus. Below is a cladogram from Soto et al. (2011):

References

Early Cretaceous crocodylomorphs
Terrestrial crocodylomorphs
 
Late Cretaceous crocodylomorphs
Early Cretaceous first appearances
Late Cretaceous extinctions
Prehistoric reptile families